Chris Lo (born 19 April 1996) is a Hong Kong professional squash player. As of February 2018, he was ranked number 168 in the world.

References

1996 births
Living people
Hong Kong male squash players